Tabare Rural LLG (formerly known as Sinasina Rural LLG) is a local-level government (LLG) of Chimbu Province, Papua New Guinea. The Sinasina language is spoken in the LLG.

Wards
 Bulagesible
 Gilmai/Arebi
 Maima
 Temisnowai
 Galaku
 Klai
 Masul 1
 Masul 2
 Yalemesi
 Yalkomno
 Kapma (Garen)
 Kapma (Mak)
 Woma
 Kautabandi

References

Local-level governments of Chimbu Province